Legion of the Damned is a Dutch thrash metal/death metal band. The band was formed in 1992 as Occult, but changed their name in 2006 to Legion of the Damned. Lyrically the band tend to focus on horror motifs, dark occult and religious themes and apocalyptic events. They have recorded their albums Malevolent Rapture and Sons of the Jackal in the well known Stage One Studio with producer Andy Classen. The special edition of their 2008 release Cult of the Dead comes with an item unique in metal merchandising (and possibly all genres of music), being a cheese block emblazoned with their logo. This is a nod to their Dutch origins.

Former band member Twan Fleuren committed suicide on 21 May 2011.

Members 
Current Members
 Maurice Swinkels – vocals (1992–present)
 Erik Fleuren – drums (1992–present)
 Harold Gielen – bass (2006–present)
 Twan van Geel – guitars (2011–present)
 Fabian Verweij – guitars (2020–present)

Former Members
 Leon Pennings – guitars (1992–1999)
 Sjors Tuithof – bass (1992–1999)
 Richard Ebisch – guitars (1994–2011)
 Rachel Heyzer – vocals (1994–2001)
 Twan Fleuren – bass (1999–2006; died 2011)

Live Members
 Fabian Verweij – guitars (2017–2020)
 Hein Willekens – guitars (2012–2017)

Timeline

Discography 
Discography as Legion of the Damned (2006-present)

 Malevolent Rapture (2006)
 Sons of the Jackal (2007)
 Feel the Blade (2008)
 Cult of the Dead (2008)
 Descent Into Chaos (2011)
 Ravenous Plague (2014)
 Slaves of the Shadow Realm (2019)
 The Poison Chalice (2023)

Discography as Occult (1992–2006)
 Prepare to Meet Thy Doom (1994)
 The Enemy Within (1996)
 Of Flesh and Blood (1999)
 Rage to Revenge (2001)
 Elegy for the Weak (2003)

References

External links 

Official website

Dutch death metal musical groups
Dutch thrash metal musical groups
Musical groups established in 2004
Musical quartets
Dutch heavy metal musical groups